The Dayton Methodist Episcopal Church, known by 1984 as the Pioneer Evangelical Church, is a historic church building in Dayton, Oregon, United States.

The church was listed on the National Register of Historic Places in 1987.

See also
National Register of Historic Places listings in Yamhill County, Oregon

References

External links

, Pioneer Evangelical Church

National Register of Historic Places in Yamhill County, Oregon
Neoclassical architecture in Oregon
Churches completed in 1862
Buildings and structures in Dayton, Oregon
Methodist churches in Oregon
Churches on the National Register of Historic Places in Oregon
1860 establishments in Oregon
Churches in Yamhill County, Oregon
Neoclassical church buildings in the United States